This is a list of the largest reservoirs in the state of Colorado. Most of the larger reservoirs in the state are owned by the United States Bureau of Reclamation and, to a lesser extent, the Corps of Engineers. Additionally, a number of these reservoirs are owned by private companies for flood control and irrigation purposes.

List

See also
List of largest reservoirs in the United States
List of dams and reservoirs in Colorado
List of rivers of Colorado

Notes

References

Colorado River Storage Project
Reservoirs in Colorado
Colorado geography-related lists